The Silent Twins is a 2022 internationally co-produced biographical drama film about the twin sisters, June and Jennifer Gibbons, who were institutionalized at Broadmoor Hospital following years of silence and teenage rebellion. It was directed by Agnieszka Smoczyńska from a screenplay by Andrea Seigel, who adapted the book of the same name by Marjorie Wallace. The film stars Letitia Wright, Tamara Lawrance, Nadine Marshall, Treva Etienne, Michael Smiley, and Jodhi May.

The Silent Twins had its world premiere at the 2022 Cannes Film Festival, under the Un Certain Regard section, on May 24, 2022, was released in the United States on September 16, 2022, by Focus Features, and was released in the United Kingdom on December 9, 2022, by Universal Pictures.

Plot
Feeling isolated from their unwelcoming community, June and Jennifer Gibbons turn inward and reject communication with everyone but each other, retreating into a fantasy world of artistic inspiration and adolescent desires. After a spree of vandalism inspired by an American teenager they both idolize, the girls are summarily sentenced to Broadmoor Hospital, an infamous psychiatric hospital, where they face the choice to separate and survive or die together.

Cast
 Letitia Wright as June Gibbons
 Leah Mondesir-Simmonds as young June Gibbons
 Tamara Lawrance as Jennifer Gibbons
 Eva-Arianna Baxter as young Jennifer Gibbons
 Nadine Marshall as Gloria Gibbons
 Treva Etienne as Aubrey Gibbons
 Michael Smiley as Tim Thomas
 Jodhi May as Marjorie Wallace
 Jack Bandeira as Wayne Kennedy
 Kinga Preis
 Amarah-Jae St. Aubyn as Greta Gibbons
 Tony Richardson as Dr. John Rees
 Declan Joyce as George Kennedy

Production
In February 2020, it was announced that Letitia Wright and Tamara Lawrance has been cast as twin sisters June and Jennifer Gibbons in the film The Silent Twins, based on the 1986 book of the same name by Marjorie Wallace, with Agnieszka Smoczyńska set to direct and Andrea Seigel set to write the screenplay, it marks Smoczyńska's English-language film debut. On April 8, 2021 it was announced that Focus Features acquired US distribution rights to the film while parent company Universal Pictures took international distribution rights. Principal photography wrapped in Poland.

Release
The Silent Twins had its world premiere at the 2022 Cannes Film Festival, under the Un Certain Regard section, on May 24, 2022. It was released in the United States by Focus Features on September 16, 2022, and was released in the United Kingdom by Universal Pictures on December 9. It also screened in the 'World Cinema' section of 27th Busan International Film Festival in October 2022.

Reception
On the review aggregator website Rotten Tomatoes, 69% of 84 critics' reviews are positive, with an average rating of 6.3/10. The website's consensus reads, "Although it struggles to really get inside the true story that inspired it, The Silent Twins is still a well-acted and poignant dramatization of actual events." Metacritic, which uses a weighted average, assigned the film a score of 59 out of 100, based on 25 critics, indicating "mixed or average reviews".

References

External links
 
 

American biographical drama films
Focus Features films
Universal Pictures films
English-language Polish films
2020s English-language films
2022 biographical drama films
2020s American films
2020s British films
British biographical drama films